Stephanie Diamond is an artist, entrepreneur and community-builder. Her work is inter-disciplinary and explores processes of self and collective healing, interpersonal communication, and community-building.

Education
She graduated with a BFA from Rhode Island School of Design in 1997, and received an MA from New York University in 2003. She is also an alumnus of the Skowhegan School of Painting and Sculpture, where she studied in 2000.

Listings Project
In 2003 she started Listings Project, a free weekly email that shares carefully vetted real estate and opportunity listings. Listings Project began as a personal email list, and has grown into one of the most widely used resources among creative communities in New York City and other cities around the world for finding living and working spaces and seeking out collaborators or new connections.

Career and work
From 1998 to 2000 she was the Education and Community Coordinator at MoMA PS1, where she organized the organization's first annual Community Day event in 1999. From 2000 to 2002 she was the Director of Education and Community Relations at Socrates Sculpture Park. Her work has been exhibited and included in major projects at the Museum of Modern Art, the Queens Museum, Massachusetts Museum of Contemporary Art (MASS MoCA), the Bronx Museum of the Arts and Project Row Houses

Stephanie is a certified 5Rhythms teacher and co-founder of Hudson Valley 5Rhythms.

References

External links 
 www.stephaniediamond.com
 www.listingsproject.com

Year of birth missing (living people)
Living people
Rhode Island School of Design alumni
New York University alumni
Skowhegan School of Painting and Sculpture alumni